Palmer is an unincorporated community in King County, Washington, United States.  It is located along the Green River next to the Kanaskat-Palmer State Park.

Palmer was originally a telegraph station on the Northern Pacific Railway opened during the construction of the railway's line across Stampede Pass c. 1886. The point was originally named "Green River." In 1888, the NP changed the name to "Palmer" for George L. Palmer, then a timber cruiser for the company and later an official in the company's Land Department. The original route across Stampede Pass traveled from Tacoma, Washington to Puyallup, Washington, where the line turned east and continued to Orting, Washington, Buckley, Washington, Enumclaw, Washington, and Palmer. The railway continued east along the Green River to Lester, Washington and Stampede Pass.

Between 1899 and 1900 the Northern Pacific built a cut-off from Palmer Junction (just east of Palmer), crossing the Green River to Kanaskat, and thence westward to Ravensdale, Covington and finally Auburn. This route is still used by today's BNSF Railway.

Climate
Palmer has an Oceanic climate (Cfb) according to the Köppen climate classification system.

References

Unincorporated communities in King County, Washington
Unincorporated communities in Washington (state)